The Second Ecumenical Council of the Vatican, commonly known as the , or , was the 21st ecumenical council of the Catholic Church. The council met in Saint Peter's Basilica in Vatican City for four periods (or sessions), each lasting between 8 and 12 weeks, in the autumn of each of the four years 1962 to 1965. Preparation for the council took three years, from the summer of 1959 to the autumn of 1962. The council was opened on 11 October 1962 by John XXIII (pope during the preparation and the first session), and was closed on 8 December 1965 by Paul VI (pope during the last three sessions, after the death of John XXIII on 3 June 1963).

Pope John XXIII called the council because he felt the Church needed "updating" (in Italian: aggiornamento). In order to connect with 20th-century people in an increasingly secularized world, some of the Church's practices needed to be improved and its teaching needed to be presented in a way that would appear relevant and understandable to them. Many Council participants were sympathetic to this, while others saw little need for change and resisted efforts in that direction. Support for aggiornamento won out over resistance to change, and as a result the sixteen magisterial documents produced by the council proposed significant developments in doctrine and practice: an extensive reform of the liturgy, a renewed theology of the Church, of revelation and of the laity, and new approaches to relations between the Church and the world, to ecumenism, to non-Christian religions, and to religious freedom.

The council had a huge impact on the Church, due to the scope and variety of issues it addressed.

Background 

In such a climate, the only acceptable theology was one based on the twin pillars of Neo-scholasticism and the encyclicals of the recent popes. When this proved insufficient to stop new ideas such as the use of the historical-critical method in Bible studies or new historical studies that cast doubt on the standard narrative of Church history, Pope Pius X issued his 1907 encyclical Pascendi dominici gregis, which identified and condemned a new heresy called modernism, which was claimed to be the embodiment of all these new ideas. The battle against modernism marked the first half of the 20th century in the Catholic Church.

But still, there were signs of new growth in various corners of the Church.

Liturgical movement 

19th-century scholarly research into the liturgy of the first centuries showed how far the current liturgy had departed from the earlier practice, where the congregation was actively involved, responding and singing in its own language. But now the mass was in Latin, a language most people did not understand, and the congregation observed in silence the ritual performed by the priest at the altar. This realization inspired a modest movement to get the congregation involved in the mass, to get them to respond and to sing those parts of the mass that belonged to them. Some even proposed that Latin be replaced by the language of the people. The liturgical movement was greeted with considerable caution by Church authorities. In the early 1950s, there was a significant reform of the ceremonies of Holy Week, but by the early 1960s, little else had changed.

Ecumenical movement 

The term “ecumenism” came into use in the 20th century to refer to efforts – initially among Protestants – towards the reunification of Christians. Initially, the Catholic Church was hostile to the ecumenical movement. The traditional position of the Church was that Catholics had nothing to learn from Protestants and the only way Christian unity would happen was when non-Catholics returned to the Catholic Church. Collaboration with non-Catholics was forbidden. By the early 1950s, there was a modest ecumenical movement within the Catholic Church, but it had little support from the authorities.

Biblical movement 

Pope Pius XII's 1943 encyclical Divino afflante spiritu gave a renewed impetus to Catholic Bible studies and encouraged the production of new Bible translations from the original languages. This led to a pastoral attempt to get ordinary Catholics to re-discover the Bible, to read it, to make it a source of their spiritual life. This found a response in very limited circles. By 1960, the movement was still in its infancy.

Ressourcement and Nouvelle théologie 

By the 1930s, mainstream theology based on neo-scholasticism and papal encyclicals was being rejected by some theologians as dry and uninspiring. Thus, was born the movement called ressourcement, the return to the sources: basing theology directly on the Bible and the Church Fathers. Some theologians also began to discuss new topics, such as the historical dimension of theology, the theology of work, ecumenism, the theology of the laity, the theology of “earthly realities”. All these writings in a new style came to be called “la nouvelle théologie”, and they soon attracted Rome's attention.

The reaction came in 1950. That year Pius XII published Humani generis, an encyclical “concerning some false opinions threatening to undermine the foundations of Catholic doctrine”. Without citing specific individuals, he criticized those who advocated new schools of theology. Everyone understood the encyclical was directly against the nouvelle théologie as well as developments in ecumenism and Bible studies. Some of these works were placed on the Index of Prohibited Books, and some of the authors were forbidden to teach or to publish. Those who suffered most were the Henri de Lubac  and the Yves Congar , who were unable to teach or publish until the death of Pius XII in 1958. By the early 1960s, other theologians under suspicion included Karl Rahner  and the young Hans Küng.

In addition, there was the unfinished business of the First Vatican Council (1869–70). When it had been cut short by the Italian Army's entry into Rome at the end of Italian unification, the only topics that had been completed were the theology of the papacy and the relationship of faith and reason, while the theology of the episcopate and of the laity were left unaddressed.

At the same time, the world's bishops were facing challenges driven by political, social, economic, and technological change. Some of these bishops were seeking new ways of addressing those challenges. So, when Pope John announced that he would convene a General Council of the Church, many wondered if he wanted to break down the “fortress Church” mentality and make room for these tentative movements for renewal that had been developing over the past few decades.

Beginnings

Announcement and expectations 
John XXIII gave notice of his intention to convene an ecumenical council on 25 January 1959, less than three months after his election in October 1958. His announcement in the chapter hall of the Benedictine monastery attached to the Basilica of Saint Paul Outside the Walls in Rome came as a surprise to the cardinals present.

He had tested the idea only ten days before with one of them, his Cardinal Secretary of State Domenico Tardini, who gave enthusiastic support to the idea. Although the pope later said the idea came to him in a flash in his conversation with Tardini, two cardinals had earlier attempted to interest him in the idea. They were two of the most conservative, Ernesto Ruffini and Alfredo Ottaviani, who had already in 1948 proposed the idea to Pius XII and who put it before John XXIII on 27 October 1958.

Over the course of the next 3 years, the Pope would make many statements describing the results he expected from the council. They formed something like 3 concentric circles:

1. For the Catholic Church, he expected a renewal which he described variously as a “new Pentecost”, a “new Springtime”, a new “blossoming”, “a rejuvenation with greater vigour of the Body of Christ that is the Church”. This would be achieved by the “updating” (aggiornamento) or “adapting” of Church practices to new circumstances and a restatement of her beliefs in a way that would connect with modern man.

2. Within the wider Christian family, he sought progress toward reunion of all Christians.

3. For the whole human family, he expected the council to contribute toward resolving major social and economic problems, such as war, hunger, underdevelopment.

Two less solemn statements are attributed to John XXIII about the purpose of the council. One is about opening the windows of the Church to let in some fresh air; the other about shaking off the imperial dust accumulated on the throne of St. Peter. They have been repeated over and over, usually without any indication of source.

The source for the second statement is Cardinal Léger of Montréal, as reported by Congar. As for the first statement, it has been repeated so many times that it may be impossible to find out if and when the Pope said it.

Once the officials of the Curia had recovered from their shock at the Pope's announcement of a Council, they realized that it could be the culmination of the Church's program of resistance to Protestantism, the Enlightenment and all the other errors of the modern world. It was the providential opportunity to give the stamp of conciliar infallibility to the teachings of the most recent popes and to the Curia's vision of the role of the Church in the modern world, provided the Pope could be convinced to forget about aggiornamento.

On the other side were those theologians and bishops who had been working towards a new way of doing things, some of whom had been silenced and humiliated by the Curia in the 1940s and 1950s. For them, the council came as a “divine surprise”, the opportunity to convince the bishops of the world to turn away from a fortress-like defensive attitude to the modern world and set off in a new direction towards a renewed theology of the Church and of the laity, ecumenism and the reform of the liturgy. 

So, soon after the Pope's announcement, the stage was set for a confrontation between two programs: continuing the resistance to the modern world or taking seriously the Pope's call for renewal.

The council was officially summoned by the apostolic constitution  on 25 December 1961.

Preparation 

Preparation for the council took over three years, from the summer of 1959 to the autumn of 1962.

The first year was known officially as the “antepreparatory period”. On 17 May 1959, Pope John appointed an Antepreparatory Commission to conduct a vast consultation of the Catholic world concerning topics to be examined at the council. Three groups of people were consulted: the bishops of the world, the Catholic universities and faculties of theology, and the departments of the Curia. By the following summer, 2,049 individuals and institutions had replied with 9,438 individual vota (“wishes”). Some were typical of past ways of doing things, asking for new dogmatic definitions or condemnations of errors. Others were in the spirit of aggiornamento, asking for reforms and new ways of doing things.

The next two years (known officially as the “preparatory period”) were occupied with preparing the drafts, called schemas, that would be submitted to the bishops for discussion at the council. On 5 June 1960, ten Preparatory Commissions were created, to which a total of 871 bishops and experts were appointed. Each preparatory commission had the same area of responsibility as one of the main departments of the Curia and was chaired by the cardinal who headed that department. From the 9,438 proposals, a list of topics was created, and these topics were parcelled out to these commissions according to their area of competence.

Some commissions prepared a separate schema for each topic they were asked to treat, others a single schema encompassing all the topics they were handed. These were the preparatory commissions and the number of schemas they prepared:

Two secretariats – one the offshoot of an existing Vatican office, the other a new body – also had a part in drafting schemas:

The total number of schemas was 70. As most of these preparatory bodies were predominantly conservative, the schemas they produced showed only modest signs of updating. The schemas drafted by the preparatory commission for theology, dominated by officials of the Holy Office (the curial department for theological orthodoxy) showed no signs of aggiornamento at all. The two notable exceptions were the preparatory commission for liturgy and the Secretariat for Christian unity, whose schemas were very much in the spirit of renewal.

In addition to these specialist commissions and secretariats, there was a Central Preparatory Commission, to which all the schemas had to be submitted for final approval. It was a large body of 108 members from 57 countries, including two thirds of the cardinals. As a result of its work, 22 schemas were eliminated from the conciliar agenda, mainly because they could be dealt with during a planned revision of the 1917 Code of Canon Law after the council, and a number of schemas were consolidated and merged, with the result that the total number of schemas was whittled down from 70 to 22.

Organization 

Paragraph numbers in this section refer to the Council Regulations published in the motu proprio Appropinquante concilio, of 6 August 1962.

Council Fathers (§1). All the bishops of the world, as well as the heads of the main religious orders of men, were entitled to be "Council Fathers", that is, full participants with the right to speak and vote. Their number was about 2,900, though some 500 of them would be unable to attend, either for reasons of health or old age, or because the Communist authorities of their country would not let them travel. The Council Fathers in attendance represented 79 countries: 38% were from Europe, 31% from the Americas, 20% from Asia & Oceania, and 10% from Africa. (At Vatican I a century earlier there were 737 Council Fathers, mostly from Europe). At Vatican II, some 250 bishops were native-born Asians and Africans, whereas at Vatican I, there were none at all.

General Congregations (§3, 20, 33, 38–39, 52–63). The Council Fathers met in daily sittings — known as General Congregations — to discuss the schemas and vote on them. These sittings took place in St. Peter's Basilica every morning until 12:30 Monday to Saturday (except Thursday). The average daily attendance was about 2,200. Stands with tiers of seats for all the Council Fathers had been built on both sides of the central nave of St. Peter's. During the first session, a council of presidents, of 10 cardinals, was responsible for presiding over the general assemblies, its members taking turns chairing each day's sitting (§4). During the later sessions, this task belonged to a council of 4 Moderators.

All votes required a two-thirds majority. For each schema, after a preliminary discussion there was a vote whether it was considered acceptable in principle, or rejected. If acceptable, debate continued with votes on individual chapters and paragraphs. Bishops could submit amendments, which were then written into the schema if they were requested by many bishops. Votes continued in this way until wide agreement was reached, after which there was a final vote on a document. This was followed some days later by a public session where the Pope promulgated the document as the official teaching of the council, following another, ceremonial, vote of the Council Fathers. There was an unwritten rule that, in order to be considered official Church teaching, a document had to receive an overwhelming majority of votes, somewhere in the area of 90%. This led to many compromises, as well as formulations that were broad enough to be acceptable by people on either side of an issue.

All General Congregations were closed to the public. Council Fathers were under an obligation not to reveal anything that went on in the daily sittings (§26). Secrecy soon broke down, and much information about the daily General Congregations was leaked to the press.

The Pope did not attend General Congregations, but followed the deliberations on closed-circuit television.

Public Sessions (§2, 44–51). These were similar to General Congregations, except that they were open to the press and television, and the Pope was present. There were 10 public sessions in the course of the council: the opening day of each of the council's four periods, 5 days when the Pope promulgated Council documents, and the final day of the council.

Commissions (§5-6, 64–70). Much of the detailed work of the council was done in these commissions. Like the preparatory commissions during the preparatory period, they were 10 in number, each covering the same area of Church life as a particular curial department and chaired by the cardinal who headed that department: 
 Commission on the Doctrine of Faith and Morals: president Cardinal Alfredo Ottaviani;
 Commission on Bishops and the Governance of Dioceses: president Cardinal Paolo Marella;
 Commission on the Eastern Churches: president Cardinal Amleto Giovanni Cicognani;
 Commission on the Discipline of the Sacraments: president Cardinal Benedetto Aloisi Masella;
 Commission for the Discipline of the Clergy and the Christian People: president Cardinal Pietro Ciriaci;
 Commission for Religious: president Cardinal Ildebrando Antoniutti;
 Commission on the Sacred Liturgy: president Cardinal Arcadio Larraona;
 Commission for the Missions: president Cardinal Gregorio Pietro XV Agagianian;
 Commission on Seminaries, Studies, and Catholic Education: president Cardinal Giuseppe Pizzardo;
 Commission for the Lay Apostolate and for the Media: president Cardinal Fernando Cento.
Each commission included 25 Council Fathers (16 elected by the council and 9 appointed by the Pope) as well as consultors (official periti appointed by the pope). In addition, the Secretariat for Promoting Christian Unity, appointed during the preparatory period, continued to exist under its president Cardinal Augustin Bea throughout the 4 years of the council, with the same powers as a commission. The commissions were tasked with revising the schemas as Council Fathers submitted amendments. They met in the afternoons or evenings. Procedure was more informal than in the general assemblies: there was spontaneous debate, sometimes heated, and Latin was not the only language used. Like the General Congregations, they were closed to the public and subject to the same rules of secrecy.

Official Periti (§9-10). These experts in theology, canon law and other areas were appointed by the Pope to advise the Council Fathers, and were assigned as consultors to the commissions, where they played an important part in re-writing the council documents. At the beginning of the council, there were 224 official periti, but their number would eventually rise to 480. They could attend the debates in the General Congregations, but could not speak. The theologians who had been silenced during the 1940s and 1950s, such as Yves Congar and Henri de Lubac, and some theologians who were under suspicion in Roman circles at the beginning of the 1960s, such as Karl Rahner and Hans Küng, were appointed periti because of their expertise. Their appointment served to vindicate their ideas and gave them a platform from which they could work to further their views.

Private Periti (§11). Each bishop was allowed to bring along a personal theological adviser of his choice. Known as “private periti”, they were not official Council participants and could not attend General Congregations or commission meetings. But like the official periti, they gave informal talks to groups of bishops, bringing them up to date on developments in their particular area of expertise. Karl Rahner, Joseph Ratzinger and Hans Küng first went to the council as some bishop's personal theologian, and were later appointed official periti. Some notable theologians, such as Edward Schillebeeckx, remained private periti for the whole duration of the council.

Observers (§18) . An important innovation was the invitation by Pope John to Orthodox and Protestant Churches to send observers to the council. Eventually 21 denominations or bodies such as the World Council of Churches were represented. The observers were entitled to sit in on all general assemblies (but not the commissions) and they mingled with the Council Fathers during the breaks and let them know their reactions to speeches or to schemas. Their presence helped to break down centuries of mistrust.

Lay auditors. While not provided for in the Official Regulations, a small number of lay people were invited to attend as “auditors” beginning with the Second Session. While not allowed to take part in debate, a few of them were asked to address the council about their concerns as lay people. The first auditors were all male, but beginning with the third session, a number of women were also appointed.

Main players 

In the very first weeks of the council proceedings, it became clear to the participants that there were two “tendencies” among the Council Fathers, those who were supporters of aggiornamento and renewal, and those who were not. The two tendencies had already appeared in the deliberations of the Central Preparatory Commission before the opening of the council.

In addition to popes John XXIII and Paul VI, these were the prominent actors at the council:

Prominent Conservative Bishops at the Council

 Cardinal Alfredo Ottaviani: secretary of the Holy Office
 Cardinal Michael Browne : professor at the Angelicum and consultor for the Holy Office.
 Cardinal Giuseppe Siri: archbishop of Genoa, president of the Italian Bishops' Conference.
 Cardinal Ernesto Ruffini: archbishop of Palermo.
 Archbishop Marcel Lefebvre : superior-general of the Congregation of the Holy Spirit; at the council, he acted as the president of the Coetus Internationalis Patrum (“International Group of Fathers”), the bloc of conservative Council Fathers

Prominent Reform-minded Bishops at the Council

 Cardinal Augustin Bea : president of the Secretariat for Promoting Christian Unity
 Patriarch Maximos IV Sayegh: patriarch of the Melkite Greek Catholic Church
 Cardinal Achille Liénart: bishop of Lille (France), the senior French bishop
 Cardinal Josef Frings: archbishop of Cologne (Germany), the senior German bishop
 Cardinal Bernardus Alfrink: archbishop of Utrecht (Netherlands), the senior Dutch bishop
 Cardinal Leo Jozef Suenens: archbishop of Mechelen-Brussels (Belgium), the senior Belgian bishop
 Cardinal Franz König, archbishop of Vienna (Austria), the senior Austrian bishop
 Cardinal Giacomo Lercaro: archbishop of Bologna (Italy)
 Cardinal Paul-Émile Léger: archbishop of Montreal (Canada)
 Cardinal Julius Döpfner: archbishop of Munich and Freising (Germany)

Prominent reform-minded theologians at the Council

 Marie-Dominique Chenu : private peritus
 Henri de Lubac : official peritus 
 Yves Congar : official peritus 
 Karl Rahner : official peritus 
 John Courtney Murray : official peritus 
 Bernhard Häring : official peritus 
 Edward Schillebeeckx : private peritus
 Joseph Ratzinger (later Pope Benedict XVI): official peritus 
 Hans Küng: official peritus

Chronology of the council

First period: 11 October – 8 December 1962

Opening Day 
John XXIII opened the council on 11 October 1962 in a public session at St. Peter's Basilica and delivered his opening address Gaudet Mater Ecclesia ("Mother Church Rejoices") before the Council Fathers and representatives of 86 governments or international groups. He criticized the "prophets of doom who are always forecasting disaster" for the church or world. He spoke of the advantage of separation of Church and state but also the challenge to integrate faith with public life.

What is needed at the present time is a new enthusiasm, a new joy and serenity of mind in the unreserved acceptance by all of the entire Christian faith, without forfeiting that accuracy and precision in its presentation which characterized the proceedings of the Council of Trent and the First Vatican Council. What is needed, and what everyone imbued with a truly Christian, Catholic and apostolic spirit craves today, is that this doctrine shall be more widely known, more deeply understood, and more penetrating in its effects on men's moral lives. What is needed is that this certain and immutable doctrine, to which the faithful owe obedience, be studied afresh and reformulated in contemporary terms. For this deposit of faith, or truths which are contained in our time-honored teaching is one thing; the manner in which these truths are set forth (with their meaning preserved intact) is something else.

The Church "meets today's needs by explaining the validity of her doctrine more fully rather than by condemning," by reformulating ancient doctrine for pastoral effectiveness. Also, the Church is "moved by mercy and goodness towards her separated children."

Commissions 
The first working session of the council was on 13 October 1962. That day's agenda included the election of members of the 10 conciliar commissions. Each was to have 16 members elected by the Council Fathers and 8 – later 9 – members appointed by the Pope. Most bishops knew very few bishops other than those from their own country, and so did not know whom to vote for. They had been provided with a list of the bishops who had served on the preparatory commissions, as if to suggest that they elect the same people to the conciliar commissions, with the result that Curial forces would dominate the conciliar commissions as they had dominated the preparatory commissions. As the voting was about to begin, Cardinal Liénart, the senior French bishop, rose and proposed that the election be delayed for a few days to allow each national group of bishops to meet and draw up a list of its own members who might be suitable candidates. Cardinal Frings, the senior German bishop, rose to second the motion. There was loud applause and the motion was declared carried. That day's sitting was adjourned after only 15 minutes.

For the next few days, Council Fathers met in national groups and drew up lists of candidates. The bishops from the 5 European countries (France, Belgium, the Netherlands, Germany and Austria) that spearheaded the renewal movement decided to create a single list, to which a number of renewal-minded bishops from other countries were added, for a total of 109 names. The election took place on October 16. It brought in new blood: 79 of these 109 were elected to a commission seat and 50% of the members of the very important doctrinal commission were among these 79. In addition 43% of the newly elected commission members had not been on any preparatory commission. This was a first success for renewal.

Liturgy schema 
On 22 October, the first schema to be discussed was the one from the very reform-minded preparatory commission for liturgy. It had 8 chapters:

1. General Principles
2. The Eucharistic Mystery [i.e. the Mass]
3. Sacraments and sacramentals
4. The Divine Office [i.e. the Liturgy of the Hours]
5. The Liturgical Year
6. Liturgical Furnishings
7. Sacred Music
8. Sacred Art 

It proposed many reforms, including active participation of the congregation, communal singing, a partial replacement of Latin by vernacular languages, communion under both kinds, concelebration, adaptation of liturgy to local cultures and a modest decentralization of liturgical authority to national episcopal conferences. The conservatives objected to all these proposals, especially to the downgrading of Latin. Debate dragged on for 15 days, before the vote was taken on whether the schema was acceptable in principle. To everyone's surprise, only 46 (out of 2,215) voted against. A second win for renewal. The schema was now returned to the liturgy commission to deal with many proposed amendments.

Schema on revelation 
This schema from the preparatory theological commission took the conservative position on all questions currently being discussed by theologians. Reformers were particularly opposed to two claims: that there were revealed truths in Tradition that were not contained in Scripture and that every assertion in the Bible was free of error. The debate lasted six days. The dramatic vote on acceptance in principle came on November 20. The question was phrased in terms of rejection: Should the schema be rejected? Yes: 1,360. No: 822. This was 102 votes short of the two-thirds majority required by Council regulations, and so the council would have to continue discussing a schema that 62% of the participants rejected. Resolution of the impasse came the next day (November 21): Pope John announced the schema would be revised by a special joint commission made up of members of the Doctrinal Commission (representing the conservative tendency) and the Secretariat for Christian Unity (representing the renewal tendency). A third victory for renewal and a crucial turning point at the council.

Schema on the modern means of communication 
This innocuous schema could be boiled down to two propositions that had been said many times before: the Church must use the media to further its mission, and people must be protected against immorality and other dangers presented by the media. There was little interest in pursuing the discussion. On November 27, the council decided the schema should contain only essential principles, leaving detailed practical matters to be dealt with after the council. The schema was accepted in principle and returned to its commission to be abridged.

Schema on Unity with the Eastern Orthodox 
This schema, drafted by the preparatory commission on the Eastern Churches, was one of three texts that had been prepared on ecumenism. Conservatives thought the schema downplayed the differences between Catholics and Orthodox, while reformers complained it conceived of unity as a return of the Orthodox to the Catholic Church. The Council Fathers avoided voting on the schema at this point, and simply ordered that the schema be merged with the other two documents on Christian unity.

Schema on the Church 
On December 1, discussion began on the schema everyone was waiting for, that on the Church. There was only one week left before the scheduled end of the First Session. The schema embodied the legalistic view of the Church to be found in current theology manuals. Some important claims: the Church of Christ is identical with the Roman Catholic Church; bishops have no authority over the universal Church except by participation in the universal authority of the pope; talk of a priesthood of the faithful is metaphorical since only clerics are priests “properly so called”. The criticism of the reformers was unrelenting. Karl Rahner and Edward Schillebeeckx wrote detailed criticisms that were circulated among the Council Fathers. Given the renewal tendency manifested in the votes on earlier schemas, the schema on the Church was quite possibly headed for defeat. The day before the scheduled vote on acceptance in principle, Pope John intervened to say there were 2 problems with the schemas so far: too much material and not enough aggiornamento. So he was appointing a special commission to supervise the rewriting of all the schemas in order to reduce the amount of material and to better reflect the vision he had outlined in his opening address.

End of the First Period 
So the First Session ended on 8 December, having made little progress with the schemas: only 5 of the 22 had been examined and none had received final approval. But something important had happened: it had become clear, to most people's surprise, that a majority of Council participants were in favour of some degree of renewal. The prediction of curialists that the bishops would readily approve all of the schemas and that the council would be over in a matter of weeks was quite mistaken. And as a result, the work of the preparatory commissions would have to be redone in order to better reflect the spirit of renewal the pope had been expecting.

Interval between first and second periods

The Coordinating Commission and the Revision of the Schemas 
At the end of the First Session, Pope John created a Coordinating Commission to supervise the conciliar commissions in the task of revising all the schemas in order to make them more open to aggiornamento and to reduce the amount of material. The commission's 7 members included 2 curial cardinals (Cicognani, the secretary of state, and Confalonieri of the Consistorial congregation) and 5 diocesan bishops (cardinals Suenens of Mechelen-Brussels, Döpfner of Munich, Liénart of Lille, Spellman of New York and Urbani of Venice. In the course of the next few months, all of the schemas would be rewritten under the Coordinating Commission's supervision. As a result, the number of schemas was reduced from 22 to 15, and they became more renewal-friendly, some of them very much so: "By the time the Council resumed on September 29 [the Coordinating Commission] had accomplished a wonder. It had reduced the number of schema to a manageable size. It had extracted revised texts from almost every commission. [...] In a little more than eight months it had made Vatican II a viable assembly and imparted to it the essential shape by which we know it."

The death of John XXIII and the election of Paul VI 
Pope John XXIII died of stomach cancer on 3 June 1963, and the council was suspended in accordance with Canon Law until the next pope decided whether or not it would continue. Two weeks later, 82 cardinals met in Rome for the conclave, and on 21 June Cardinal Giovanni Battista Montini of Milan, a moderate reformer, was elected pope, taking the name Paul VI. The day after his election, Paul VI announced that the council would continue and that it would be his “chief work”.

Reorganization 
Before the end of the summer, Paul VI decided to reorganize some of the structures of the council. The Coordinating Commission, originally intended to be temporary, was enlarged and made a permanent feature with oversight over the conciliar commissions. Four of its members—renewal-minded Cardinals Suenens, Döpfner and Lercaro (of Bologna), and moderate curialist Cardinal Agagianian—were given the additional task of chairing the daily General Congregations (instead of the 10-member Council of Presidents) with the title of “Moderators”. Because they were members of the Coordinating Commission that supervised the other commissions and they also chaired the daily General Congregations, these four cardinals, three of whom were enthusiastic reformers, became the organizational linchpins of the council.

Before the beginning of the Second Period of the council, Pope Paul created a new category of Council participants: lay auditors, who sat in on General Congregations, though without the right to speak or vote. He also allowed more information about daily General Congregations to be provided to the press.

Second period: 29 September – 4 December 1963

Opening 
In his hour-long Opening Address, Pope Paul reiterated the importance of the council, of Pope John's vision, of aggiornamento, and outlined what he considered to be the council's four tasks:
 The Church must present the world with a statement of its self-understanding. 
 Aggiornamento must continue, not by breaking with tradition, but by removing what is defective.
 The Church must work towards unity among all Christians. Saying this, he turned to the non-Catholic observers and apologized for any injury the Catholic Church might have caused other Christians.
 The Church must engage in dialogue with the world: “not to conquer but to serve, not to despise but to appreciate, not to condemn but to comfort and save”.

Five schemas were on the agenda for the Second Period, as well as the two accepted in principle during the First Period: Liturgy and Means of Social Communication.

Schema on the Church 
It was practically a new schema compared to the one discussed in the First Period. It now contained much more Biblical imagery than legal language (believers were now called the “People of God” rather than the “subjects of the Church”), and there were 4 chapters instead of 11:

1. The Mystery of the Church
2. The Hierarchical Structure of the Church 
3. The People of God 
4. The Universal Call to Holiness (an expansion of the former “The States of Perfection”)

After 2 days of debate, it was accepted in principle by a vote of 2,231 to 43.

Chapter 1: The Mystery of the Church

The most important issue in this chapter concerned the relation of the Mystical body of Christ to the Catholic Church and to other Christian denominations. Instead of speaking of membership in the Church, the schema spoke of being “in communion with” the Church: this allowed it to say that non-Catholic Christians were in “imperfect communion” with the Church of Christ. Many elements of sanctification are available outside the Church, and the Holy Spirit works for the sanctification of all the baptized.

Chapter 2: The Hierarchical Structure of the Church

The question of the relation of bishops to the Pope would be the great bone of contention of the Second Session. The traditional view was that bishops derived their authority to govern from the Pope and their authority was limited to their diocese except during an ecumenical Council. The schema proposed that bishops' authority derived from their ordination, and that all the bishops formed a “College” that, together with the Pope, had authority over the whole Church at all times, but especially during a General Council.

Conservatives argued that this diminished the Pope's authority, and therefore went against Vatican I's definition of the Pope's primacy. The schema said the Church was founded on Peter and the apostles, but the conservatives responded that it was founded on Peter alone, and therefore collegiality – the collegial nature of Church authority – had no basis in Scripture.

Another topic of controversy in the chapter was the proposal that the diaconate be restored as a permanent ordained ministry, and especially the suggestion that it might be open to married men. The prospect of ordained ministers who were married shocked some conservatives.

The debate on Chapter 2 lasted from October 4 to 15, as the same arguments were stated over and over again. Seeing that the debate was getting bogged down, the moderators met with the Pope to discuss the way forward. It was suggested to extract from the text a series of propositions and to have the Council Fathers vote on them so as to ascertain the “mind of the Council”. The Pope first accepted, then backed down when lobbied by conservatives, then agreed once again. The vote on 5 propositions took place on October 30:
 
1. Episcopal consecration is the highest degree of the sacrament of orders. Yes: 2,123. No: 34
2. All legitimately consecrated bishops who are in communion with one another and with the Pope form a College of Bishops. Yes: 2,154. No: 104.
3. This College of Bishops is the successor of the College of the Apostles and, in communion with the Pope, enjoys full and supreme power over the universal Church. Yes: 2,148. No: 336.
4. The authority of the College of Bishops (united with the Pope) is of divine origin [and not by delegation from the Pope]. Yes: 2,138. No: 408.
5. It is opportune to consider the restoration of the diaconate as a permanent degree of ordained ministry. Yes: 2,120. No: 525.

Again, lop-sided majorities in favour of renewal, though almost 20% of the Council Fathers voted against proposition 4, and almost 25% against proposition 5. Though collegiality was an idea most of the bishops had never heard of before, they had experienced collegiality at the council itself, and this experience had convinced them of the validity of the idea.

Chapter 3: The People of God

Some of the ideas developed in the chapter were:
 baptism as the basis for the participation of Christians in Christ's mission as priest, prophetic and king;
 the sensus fidelium (the “sense of the faithful”)
 the sanctification of Christians can occur even through their secular pursuits;
 infallibility as a charism of the whole People of God, and not just of the bishops and Pope.

The conservatives said the chapter minimized the difference between laity and clergy, and embraced the Protestant idea of the priesthood of all baptized, when in fact it was only a metaphor.

Chapter 4: The Universal Call to Holiness

Unlike the previous version that focused on the call to holiness of members of religious orders, this new version began with the idea that all Christians were called to holiness and it is only after this that the religious life was described as one way of achieving holiness.

Schema on the Virgin Mary 
This schema produced by the preparatory theological commission was in line with traditional Catholic doctrine: it reasserted the importance of Marian devotion (against those who thought Marian piety was excessive), her perpetual virginity (against those who questioned this), her universal mediation and her central role in redemption (though not the claim that she was co-redeemer). The reformers thought the schema on Mary should be a chapter of the schema on the Church. The conservatives wanted it to remain separate in order to stress her importance. The vote on 29 October was surprisingly close: the proposal to move the schema on Mary into the schema on the Church won by only 40 votes.

Schema on Bishops and the Governance of Dioceses 
This was a relatively short document that dealt with practical matters: the relationship of diocesan bishops to the Curia, to their priests and to religious orders; the role of auxiliary bishops; the division or amalgamation of dioceses; national bishops' conferences. The theology underpinning the schema was traditional: stress on the primacy of the pope; episcopal authority as a concession by the pope; and of course, nothing about collegiality. This became the main argument of the reformers in favour of having the schema rewritten. Some of them were arguing for the creation of a council of bishops with a rotating membership that would always be in session in Rome to assist the pope in the governance of the Church.

Most of the discussion was about the relation between bishops and the central government of the Church. In the course of this discussion, Cardinal Frings of Cologne delivered a biting criticism of the Curia, arguing that the central administration of the Church had to be thoroughly reformed, especially the Holy Office. Cardinal Ottaviani angrily responded, defending the Curia and the department he headed. This passionate exchange was the most dramatic moment of the Second Session. Cardinal Frings' speech had been written in part by his personal theologian, Joseph Ratzinger, who would one day become the head of the same Holy Office, renamed in 1967 the Congregation for the Doctrine of the Faith.

Other topics that were touched on during the discussion were the status of national episcopal conferences, and the need for bishops to retire at a certain age. Surprisingly, no one raised the question of how bishops were appointed.

Schemas on Liturgy and Modern Means of Communication 
The council then brought to a close the discussion of the two schemas approved in principle during the First Period. For the schema on liturgy, matters proceeded quickly and on November 22, the document that would set in motion the most important liturgical reform in the history of the Church received final approval by a vote of 2,159 to 19.

Many Fathers found the schema on the modern means of communication lackluster and innocuous. Some decided to vote against it for that reason, but many others just wanted to get it out of the way in order to focus on more important matters. So, it received final approval on November 25 by a vote of 1,598 to 503. A quarter of the Fathers vote against it to show their displeasure.

Schema on Ecumenism 
The revised schema on ecumenism from the Secretariat for Christian Unity came before the council on November 18. It was a hybrid document of 5 chapters, 3 of them on ecumenism, one on non-Christian religions ("especially the Jews") and one on religious liberty. All 3 topics were controversial.

The 3 chapters on ecumenism (a merger of 3 previous documents) took a very positive view of ecumenism, and said things some bishops had never heard before:

 Catholics must be involved in ecumenical endeavours (a reversal of the pre-conciliar ban on involvement)
 Catholics should acknowledge that faults by Catholics in the past often contributed to separation
 The document contained no call for non-Catholics to “return” to the Catholic Church
 Chapter 3 listed many admirable features of non-Catholic Christians.

Some conservatives spoke out against the text, repeating the Church's traditional stand that non-Catholics were in error and should simply return to the true Church. Nevertheless, the chapters on ecumenism were surprisingly well received, and were accepted in principle by a wide margin, with only 86 dissenting voices. Discussion of the 3 chapters on ecumenism took up all the time remaining before the end of the second session, and there was no time left to discuss non-Christian religions or religious freedom.

The End of the Second Period 
At a public session on December 4, Pope Paul solemnly promulgated the first two documents of the council: the Constitution on Sacred Liturgy (Sacrosanctum Concilium) and the Decree on the Modern Means of Social Communication (Inter mirifica). At the end of his closing speech, he stunned the Council Fathers by announcing that he would undertake a pilgrimage to the Holy Land, the first time in five centuries a Pope had left Italy (except for the time when Napoleon carried off the pope to France as his prisoner).

Interval between second and third periods

Pilgrimage to the Holy Land 
In early January (4-6 January 1964) pope Paul went on a three-day pilgrimage to the Holy Land, where he met Athenagoras, patriarch of Constantinople and spiritual head of the Eastern Orthodox churches. It was the first meeting between a pope and a patriarch of Constantinople in 600 years. It broke down centuries of suspicion and estrangement, and gave great hope to the ecumenical movement.

Revision of the schemas 
The revision of the schemas continued. By mid-summer, all of the remaining schemas were sent to the Council Fathers in the expectation that the next Session would be the last. The revision of the schema on the Church had been particularly difficult. In mid-summer pope Paul surprised everyone by letting the doctrinal commission know that he would like some changes to the schema. The Commission accepted some changes he wanted but not others, and the pope seemed satisfied. The day before the beginning of the Third Session, the pope received a confidential memorandum from 25 cardinals and 13 superiors-general of religious orders of men, asking him to intervene and prevent the doctrine of collegiality from being accepted at the council.

Encyclical on the Church 
Five weeks before the opening of the Third Session, pope Paul published his first encyclical, Ecclesiam suam, on the Church. Some were annoyed that the pope would issue an encyclical on the very subject that was being discussed at the council.

Women lay auditors 
Following a remark by Cardinal Suenens at the end of the second session that women were absent from the council, pope Paul appointed 15 women to be lay auditors during the third Session. Eventually 23 women, including 10 religious, would sit in on debates as official auditors. While 3 of the male auditors would eventually be asked to address the Council Fathers about their concerns as laypeople, none of the women would be asked to speak.

Third period: 14 September – 21 November 1964

Opening 
The Third Session opened with a ceremony that most people in the Latin Church had never experienced before: a concelebrated mass. The Pope celebrated mass along with 24 bishops representing 19 different countries. The mass was followed by a long address by the Pope, in which the relationship between the papacy and the episcopal office figured prominently. While granting the importance of strengthening the episcopal function, he defended the authority and prerogatives of the papacy.

Most Council Fathers hoped this would be the final Session of the council. The hope was optimistic since 6 schemas had not finished their course through the conciliar process, and 8 others had not even been examined yet. Seven of these were “practical” schemas whose goal was to update various aspects of the life and practice of the Church. The eighth was the important schema about the Church in the Modern World. It would eventually become clear that a fourth session was necessary.

Schema on the Church 
After being revised during the interval, the schema now had 8 chapters instead of 4.

1. The Mystery of the Church 		            	
2. The People of God
3. The Hierarchical Structure; in particular the Episcopate	            	
4. The Laity
5. The Universal Call to Holiness
6. The Religious Life
7. The Pilgrim Church and its Union with the Church in Heaven
8. The Virgin Mary

The chapter on the People of God had been moved from third to second place, so that the unifying factor (of being the People of God) came before the distinction between clergy (chapter 3) and laity (chapter 4). From the previous chapter on the universal call to holiness, 2 new chapters had been extracted: one on the laity with its own theology (chapter 4) and one on the religious life as one way of responding to the call to holiness (chapter 6). A chapter on the Church in heaven had been added, and the former schema on the Virgin Mary had been adapted to become chapter 8.

In order to make sure chapter 3 reflected as closely as possible the wishes of the Fathers, there would be 39 separate votes on various parts of the chapter and various formulations of its provisions. The voting took place over the course of 8 sittings, from September 21 to 30. Every formulation but one was accepted with large majorities, including those on collegiality, on the restoration of the diaconate and on admitting married men to the diaconate. The only one voted down was to allow unmarried permanent deacons to marry after ordination.

Schema on Bishops 
The revised schema on bishops was very different from the conservative text discussed at the previous Session. It now began with an affirmation of collegiality, and it proposed, in very general terms, that collegiality be implemented by creating a body of bishops that would meet regularly with the Pope. It also proposed in equally general terms a reform of the Curia.

Schemas on religious freedom and non-Christian religions 

On 23 September, the Council Fathers finally got the opportunity to discuss the 2 texts that had originally been appended to the schema on ecumenism and were now separate schemas.

Religious Freedom

The text on religious freedom proclaimed the right of everyone to freedom of religion. That is, freedom from coercion by the state in matters of religious belief and practice. It was well known that there was strong opposition to this declaration, perhaps even greater than to collegiality. Quite simply, it ran counter to the position the Catholic Church had defended for centuries.

The Church's traditional position was that Catholics were entitled to freedom everywhere, but non-Catholics were not entitled to freedom in countries with a Catholic majority. In the mid-20th century, there were still discriminatory laws against Protestants in Spain and some Latin American countries. Protestants claimed the Catholic Church's stance on ecumenism could not be taken seriously as long as it supported such restrictions on religious freedom.

The Church's basic premise before Vatican II was that Catholicism was the only true religion and, since “error has no rights”, no other religion was entitled to religious freedom. If all religions were treated equally, that would imply they were all of equal value, a position labelled “indifferentism”. If the council was to defend religious freedom, it had to do so in a way that did not imply that all religions were of equal value. The text presented to the Council did this by basing religious freedom on the person's duty to obey his/her conscience. From this, it followed that the law must not coerce a person to act against his/her conscience.

The criticism from the conservatives about a declaration of religious freedom was unrelenting: “this represented a reversal of the Church's previous teaching... it fostered indifferentism... it was Modernism... it would cause the ruin of the Catholic Church,” said Archbishop Lefebvre.

Support for religious freedom was strongest among the bishops from countries where it was the normal state of affairs, such as the English-speaking world and most Western European countries. The American bishops, who had not played a particularly important role at the council up to this point, made religious freedom “their” cause. Religious freedom was also defended by bishops who lived under communist regimes where the Church suffered persecution. In the mind of supporters, the Church's double standard was simply untenable: Catholics could no longer demand freedom for themselves while denying it to others.

Given the ferocity of the opposition, many wondered whether the chapter would ever manage to receive the requisite two-thirds majority.

“On the Jews and non-Christians”

Pope John had wanted the Church to take a stand against all forms of anti-Semitism. A first statement “On the Jews” had been prepared for the first session, then dropped for political reasons: Arab Christians claimed their governments would interpret it as tilting towards Israel in the Arab-Jewish Middle East conflict, and Christians would suffer for this. A statement on the Jews now returned as part of a broader schema “On the Jews and non-Christians”.

The objective was to reject any theological basis for antisemitism, in particular the centuries-old claim that the Jews were cursed by God because they had refused to accept the Gospel and had killed Christ. Many bishops supported the declaration. As with religious freedom, the Americans were strongly in favour. But some conservatives were unwilling to deviate from the traditional line of thinking. The discussion lasted two days, and on September 30, the chapter was returned to the Secretariat for Christian Unity for further revision.

Papal Intervention

The normal course of events was suddenly interrupted a week and a half later (19 October). Pope Paul, obviously under pressure from conservatives, let it be known that he wanted the texts on Religious Freedom and on Non-Christian Religions rewritten by a joint commission that would include conservative members of the Doctrinal Commission. The outcry was considerable and eventually the Pope backed down.

Schema on Revelation 
After being rejected in the First Session, the schema on Revelation had not made a return appearance since that remarkable day almost 2 years earlier. A second version had been produced in 1963 but it was considered too bland, and a third version was not ready in time to be introduced during the Second Session. And so on September 30 this third version was presented to the Council Fathers.

Where the original version said there were two separate sources of Revelation – Scripture and Tradition – and that some revealed truths were contained in Tradition alone, the current version took a more nuanced position. It rejected the idea that there were two separate “sources” of Revelation or that Revelation consisted in propositions handed down by God, some in the Bible and others in Tradition. There is only one source, which is God revealing himself. Instead of insisting on the “separateness” of Scripture and Tradition, it insisted on their close connection, without indicating exactly how they were connected. But most importantly, it said nothing about whether Tradition contained revealed truths that were not in the Bible. The conservatives strongly insisted on such a statement. The reformers, on the other hand, thought the issue was not ready to be settled: they wanted to leave it open to further discussion by theologians.

The new text said that Tradition was found not only in the Church's teaching, but in its liturgy and in people's spiritual experiences. The conservatives thought this too subjective. The schema said that Tradition “progresses”. The conservatives would have none of this. The schema did not state clearly whether the Bible was completely free from error. The conservatives insisted the text should clearly state that it was.

In spite of these objections, it was clear the schema had considerable support. Discussion ended on October 6, and the text was sent to the doctrinal commission for further revision.

Seven New Schemas 

After 3 weeks of dealing with the schemas already moving through the conciliar process, the Council Fathers then turned to examining the schemas they had not yet seen. They were introduced in rapid succession at a rate of about one a week.

Schema on the Apostolate of the Laity

The theology of the laity had been set out in chapter 4 of the document on the Church. Now, this 5-chapter schema on the Lay Apostolate was meant as the practical application of this theology. Introduced on October 6, it stated that lay people had their own task of changing the world in accordance with the Gospel, and that this mission was based on their baptism and their participation in the royal priesthood of Christ. They carried out this mission either individually – by bearing witness to the Gospel in their personal lives – or by taking part in Church organizations and movements.

All of this was relatively uncontroversial. There was one divisive issue. The traditional view was that, in performing their mission in the world, the laity always had to be under the direction of the clergy. The “modern” view was that this should not always be the case. Some speakers thought the schema did not insist enough on the laity's role as subordinate to the clergy; others claimed it insisted too much on this subordinate role and was “too clerical”.

Debate ended on October 13. Before the schema was sent off to be revised according to the bishops' comments, a layman spoke to the bishops about the schema: he was Patrick Keegan, president of the World Federation of Christian Workers. This was the first time a layperson had been asked to express his views on a schema being discussed by the Council Fathers.

Schema on the Ministry and Life of Priests

Introduced on 13 October, the schema sought to give a renewed vision of the task of priests, for example, by insisting that priests should act towards laypeople “not only as pastors and teachers but also as brothers dealing with brothers”. The schema also insisted on the importance of clerical celibacy. While most of the speakers at the council tip-toed around the issue, there was much talk outside the council hall about the future of clerical celibacy. Some speakers mentioned the lack of priests in Latin America and the decline in vocations that was already taking place in Italy and France, and wondered what measures could be taken to reverse the trend.

Schema on the Eastern Churches

The Eastern Catholic Churches were those branches of Catholicism in Eastern Europe and the Middle East – the Maronites, the Melkites, the Copts, the Ukrainians – whose theological, canonical and liturgical traditions were rooted in ancient Greek Christianity. They represented a very small fraction of the total population of the Catholic Church and in the past often had Latin traditions imposed on them. In these Churches decision-making was usually collegial, and the most important of these Churches were headed by a Patriarch.

The schema that was presented to the ouncil on October 15 sought to defend their particular traditions against the inevitable tendency to “Latinize” them. Some thought the schema was still “too Western” but on the whole it was well received by the Council Fathers, and only a few revisions were necessary before it was ready for final approval a few weeks later.

Schema on the Church's Missionary Activity

Presented on 6 November, the schema sought to give a renewed vision of the Church's missionary activity, by arguing for less control by Rome and greater adaptation to local cultures. It was judged to be too cursory and was sent back to its commission to be expanded.

Schema on the Renewal of Religious Life

The schema called for religious orders to adapt to modern conditions while remaining faithful to their original purpose and spirit. After 2 days of discussion (November 10–12) it too was judged to be too brief and was sent back to be expanded.

Schema on Priestly Formation

This schema, introduced on 12 November, presented a renewed vision of the training of priests. It put forward a few innovative proposals: the program of priestly training should be determined by the bishops of each country rather than by Rome (though Rome's approval would be required), and the study of Scripture should be the basis for seminary studies. Some conservatives complained that the schema did not insist on the centrality of the theology of Thomas Aquinas in the curriculum. But the bishops' reception of the document was overwhelmingly positive.

Schema on Christian Education

Introduced on November 17, four days before the end of the Session, this schema was a bland document that mainly reiterated what the Church had been saying about Catholic education. Coming as it did during the last week of the Third Session, it found itself embroiled in the turbulent events of that week (see below). So the bishops gave it a hasty preliminary approval, to get it out of the way.

Schema on the Church in the Modern World 

On October 20, the last of the great doctrinal schemas was presented to the Council Fathers. It had had a lengthy genesis and had not been ready before this late date. The idea for a “social” schema, one that discussed the problems of the modern world and the Church's willingness to take part in solving them, was born during the interval between the First and Second Periods, and the project had gone through many drafts before it was ready for the Council Fathers. No previous Council had ever attempted such a project: instead of being concerned with internal Church matters, the schema addressed contemporary social problems, such as economic and social justice, and problems of war and peace.

The schema included 4 short chapters of a more theoretical nature giving the theological basis for the Church's – and the individual Christian's – involvement in social matters, and 5 appendices addressing practical issues:

Introduction
Chapter 1: On the human vocation
Chapter 2: On the Church in service to God and mankind
Chapter 3: On how Christians should conduct themselves in the world in which they lived
Chapter 4: On some special responsibilities of Christians in today's world
Conclusion

Appendix 1: On the human person in society
Appendix 2: On marriage and the family
Appendix 3: On the promotion of culture
Appendix 4: On economic and social issues
Appendix 5: On human solidarity and peace

Certain themes could be found throughout the document, such as the dignity of the human person, the need for solidarity among people of all racial, ethnic, religious or socioeconomic groups and the obligation of all people to work for a world of greater justice. The schema presented the Church as a beacon of hope in a troubled world and a helpmate for all persons of good will. While the Church had a specific message to present to the world – that of the Gospel – she wanted to play a “servant” role, and was ready to “dialogue” with the modern world in a search for solutions. And she even acknowledged that the world could help the Church be true to herself.

Most speakers welcomed the schema. Few thought it was a bad idea in principle, but there were many suggestions to improve it. From the conservatives: the Church should be talking more about its supernatural mission than about human endeavours, and the schema should contain a condemnation of Marxism. From the reformers: the schema should promote the position of women in society; there should be a strong condemnation of racism; the schema should condemn nuclear war.

The most interesting result of the discussion was the division it created among the reform-minded bishops and theologians. The French loved the document, which reflected typical concerns of recent French theology, while the Germans thought it was too optimistic and discounted the sinfulness of the world. Congar and Daniélou represented the first view, Rahner and Ratzinger the second.

The appendix on marriage and the family caused fireworks. The conservatives were indignant that:
- the text treated the two traditional ends of marriage (procreation of children and mutual love of the spouses) as if they were of equal importance, while the long-standing position had been that procreation was the “primary” end;
- the text said the spouses were entitled to decide the number of children they would have;
- the text did not explicitly reaffirm the recent popes' condemnation of birth control.

Birth control was the burning issue of the day. In 1963 Pope John had set up a papal commission to study the issue. There was a general understanding that the council should avoid discussing the issue and wait until the papal commission had reported. But that was easier said than done. Various Council Fathers began suggesting that perhaps the time had come to revisit the Church's ban on contraception.

After 2 weeks of debate, the schema was returned for revision by the joint Commission that had produced it.

“Black Week” 

At the beginning of the last week of the Third Session (Monday, 16 November), the schemas on the Church and on Ecumenism were ready for final approval that week, and that on Religious Freedom was almost there. But the Council Fathers were about to experience the most dramatic and disturbing week of the whole Council. The reformers nicknamed it “Black Week”.

These three schemas were still being opposed by a dogged group of conservatives. Because they did not have the votes to prevent final approval, their only recourse was to lobby Pope Paul to prevent their adoption in their present form. The pressure on the Pope was unrelenting, and eventually he gave in.

Religious Freedom

The schema on Religious Freedom that the bishops were to vote on had been considerably amended since the earlier debate at the beginning of the current session. The opponents now raised a procedural point: the text was substantially different from the one discussed earlier, and Council Regulations required that there be a new debate on this amended text rather than simply proceed to a vote. The Pope was lobbied by both groups, the reformers insisting the vote should go ahead, the conservatives that it should not. He finally sided with the conservatives, and the Council Fathers were told the schema on Religious Freedom would be postponed until the Fourth Session. While many Council Fathers were furious at the time, in retrospect his decision now seems reasonable.

Ecumenism

As the earlier votes on each of its chapters had shown, the schema on Ecumenism had overwhelming support. But some conservatives had convinced the Pope that some of the wording was dangerous. On November 19, two days before the end of the session, Pope Paul sent the Council Fathers 19 changes he insisted be made to the schema before he would agree to promulgate it. The changes had little effect on the substance of the schema, but seemed to many people to be petty. Some of them offended the Protestant observers: for instance, in the section listing the positive features of Protestantism, the passage that said Protestants “found” Christ in the Scriptures had to be changed to say they “sought” Christ in the Scriptures. Faced with this ultimatum, the Council Fathers agreed to the changes and the final vote on the schema was again a landslide: 2,054 to 64.

The Church

The most important intervention by Pope Paul concerned chapter 3 of the schema on the Church, the chapter dealing with collegiality. Opponents of the schema argued that it diminished the Pope's powers, and Pope Paul came to be convinced of this. So he insisted that a Nota explicativa praevia (“Preliminary Explanatory Note”) be added to the schema, saying collegiality did not diminish the Church's traditional teaching about the primacy of the Pope. The conservatives were satisfied this note robbed collegiality of all its force, while reformers thought it would have no effect on the way collegiality would be understood after the council. But the note did have two immediate consequences: this last-minute unilateral intervention created great resentment among the reformers and damaged relations between them and the Pope, but it also convinced most of the holdouts to accept the schema. The final vote on the schema on November 19 was almost unanimous: 2,134 to 10.

On the Vatican website, the explanatory note can be found between the main text and the endnotes.

The End of the Third Session 

Saturday, November 21 was the closing day of the Third Session. Three schemas now became official Council documents when they were promulgated by the Pope: the very important Constitution on the Church, the Decree on Ecumenism and the Decree on the Eastern Churches.

During the closing ceremony, Pope Paul delivered a long address in which he expressed satisfaction with the work of the Third Session. Halfway through the address, he began speaking of the Virgin Mary, and then spent the last half of the address on this subject. He announced he was conferring on Mary a new title, that of “Mother of the Church”. This displeased many people: the title was not traditional, it was an obstacle to ecumenism, and it placed Mary above the Church rather than within it. This move capped a week of initiatives by the Pope that frayed relations between him and the Council Fathers. After a very stressful week, everyone was happy to go home.

Interval between third and fourth periods

Trip to India 
In early December 1965, Pope Paul travelled to India to take part in the International Eucharistic Congress held in Bombay (now Mumbai). By visiting a non-Christian third-world country, he wanted to show the Church's openness to non-Christian religions and to the problems of the modern world, two topics being discussed at the council.

First liturgical changes 
The previous September, the Consilium for the Implementation of the Constitution on the Liturgy had published the first changes to the celebration of mass, changes to come into effect on 7 March 1965. On that day, Catholics around the world experienced for the first time mass celebrated partly in their own language and “facing the people”. To show his support for these changes, Pope Paul began celebrating mass according to the new rules each Sunday in a different Rome parish.

Ongoing revision of the schemas 
At the end of the third session, 11 schemas remained unfinished and during the interval between the sessions the commissions worked to give them their final form. The schemas that were having the bumpiest ride were those on Revelation, Religious freedom, Non-Christian Religions, and The Church in the Modern World. Cardinal Ritter observed that, "We were stalled by the delaying tactics of a very small minority" in the Curia who were more industrious in communicating with the pope than was the more progressive majority.

Fourth period: 14 September – 8 December 1965 
The last period of the council opened on September 14, 1965. There were still 11 schemas making their way through the conciliar process. Given the number of schemas, the session was planned to be 12 weeks long, 2 weeks longer than the others.

Opening 
Pope Paul gave a long opening address, extolling the council as a great event in the life of the Church and expressing great support for the Church's concern for the fate of the world (echoes of the schema on the Church in the Modern World).

He then made 2 surprising announcements. He planned on creating a body of bishops that would meet occasionally with him in an exercise of collegial responsibility for the whole Church. Great applause. Secondly, he would go to New York to speak at the United Nations about the Church's interest in fostering “concord, justice, fraternal love, and peace among all human beings”. More applause. The two announcements buoyed the spirits of the Council Fathers at the beginning of what promised to be a long and possibly difficult Fourth Session.

The very next day, the Pope issued Apostolica sollicitudo, the motu proprio creating the Synod of Bishops. Enthusiasm waned when it became clear that the Synod would be a purely advisory body completely under the authority of the Pope. Those who thought the Synod of Bishops might one day exercise power over the Curia were disappointed. Some believed the sudden announcement was a preemptive move to forestall any vote by the council in favour of a more powerful episcopal body.

Schemas: Religious Freedom, Revelation 

Religious Freedom

Though a procedural maneuver at the end of the last session had succeeded in prolonging debate on the schema, nothing new was being said. The same arguments were being advanced for and against by the same people as before. After three days of repetitive debate, the vote on whether the schema was acceptable in principle took place September 21: 1,997 in favour, 224 opposed. Some 10% of the Council Fathers were opposed, but this was far less than was feared.

Revelation

The schema on Revelation returned to the council hall, changed slightly from the previous Session, when it had been approved in principle. It still did not say what the conservatives wanted: a clear statement that Tradition contained revealed truths not found in Scripture. Instead, the schema had adopted a compromise position: “The whole of Catholic doctrine cannot be proved from Scripture alone.” That wasn't enough for the conservatives. But the time for debating was over: the schema had returned to the council hall only to be voted on. There were multiple votes, ending on September 22. The schema passed easily, but 1,498 amendments were proposed. And so the schema was returned to the Doctrinal Commission.

As the conservatives realized they could not win in the council hall, they went to the Pope. Two days later, Cardinal Ottaviani, head of the Doctrinal Commission, received a letter from Pope Paul indicating that he wanted the schema to be more specific about Tradition as a “source of revelation”. This created division within the commission, as many were dead set against this, while others did not want to antagonize the Pope. After days of debate, the commission finally settled on the following: “The Church does not draw her certainty for all revealed truths from Scripture alone.” This seemed to satisfy the Pope. After the Commission dealt with all the amendments submitted by the Council Fathers, the schema would return for a final vote later in the session.

Schema on the Church in the Modern World 

On September 21, the Council Fathers began discussing the schema on the Church in the Modern World. Many changes had been made to the text first seen during the previous session, but they were mainly matters of detail. The 5 appendices of the previous version had been converted to chapters, so it was now a schema of two parts, a more theoretical one of 4 chapters about the vocation of man and the Church's role of service for the well-being of mankind, and a more practical one of 5 chapters discussing topics such as marriage, culture, social justice, and war and peace.

The schema was a remarkable document, unique in the history of councils. The Church, it said, sees itself as a partner in cooperation and dialogue with the whole of humanity. All members of the human family must work together for a more humane world. For Christians, “nothing that is genuinely human fails to find an echo in their hearts.” The text went so far as to say that the Church could learn from the secular world. It was a far cry from the condemnations of the errors of the world that were so typical of Church pronouncements. 

Among the problems facing the schema was the fact that the Germans thought it was too optimistic. The French and German bishops met to try to come to an understanding. Eventually, many German bishops would accept the schema grudgingly as better than nothing.

The conservatives attacked the schema: the supernatural mission of the Church was being forgotten. Some Fathers wondered if it deserved to be a Constitution, or whether it shouldn't be a letter or message to the world. But, after 3 days of discussion the Fathers voted to accept it in principle, and then moved on to study each of its chapters.

The theoretical part of the schema was generally well received. Some bishops wanted an explicit condemnation of communism; as a compromise, the schema referred to previous papal condemnations but did not issue a condemnation of its own.

The chapter about marriage and the family still did not say that procreation was the primary end of marriage. Many bishops were shocked when a Melkite archbishop said the Church should find a way to allow an abandoned spouse to remarry.

Most bishops said nice things about the chapter on culture. A notable speech was given by archbishop Pellegrino of Turin: he called for greater freedom of research in the Church and a less punitive attitude by Church authorities – he was thinking here especially of the Holy Office, headed by Cardinal Ottaviani – towards thinkers who choose to pursue new issues in theology.

The next chapter, on social and economic matters, discussed issues that had been treated by the papal encyclicals that formed what is known as the Social Doctrine of the Church. Some Council Fathers questioned the need for such a chapter, since the papal encyclicals already said everything that needed to be said. But the chapter was well received by most Fathers.

The last chapter was about war and peace. The main issue was whether the availability of nuclear weapons made obsolete the traditional distinction between just and unjust wars. Many speakers thought so: no war that made use of nuclear weapons could be a just war. A related issue was whether it was legitimate to even have nuclear weapons. Many thought it was legitimate to have them (as a deterrent) but not to make use of them. A few American bishops, wanting to defend their country's possession of nuclear weapons, organized a campaign urging Council Fathers to vote against the schema's position on nuclear arms, but it fizzled out.

The debate on the schema ended on October 8 after 13 days of discussion. The schema now returned to its originating Committee for revision. There were 400 pages of proposed amendments to deal with, and the question was whether the commission could sift through them and return the schema to the full assembly in time for the schema to be accepted before the end of the session.

Pope Paul at the United Nations 

Part way through the debate on the Church in the Modern World, the Council Fathers' attention turned towards North America, for on October 4, Pope Paul travelled to New York City to deliver an address to the United Nations. It was the first time a Pope visited the Western Hemisphere. The trip attracted world attention.

His address to the UN – in French – made three points.
 He wanted to express the Catholic Church's support for the UN on its 20th anniversary and for its role as an instrument of peaceful cooperation among nations;
 He proclaimed the importance of human rights and the dignity of all persons, and specifically mentioned religious freedom (a message to those back in Rome who were obstructing the schema on religious freedom)
 He spoke of the necessity of world peace and of the horrors of war. The most striking statement in the address was “No more war! War never again!”

Schemas: Missions, Education, Non-Christian religions, Priests 

The missionary activity of the Church

On October 8, the Council Fathers began discussing the schema on the missions, completely rewritten since the last session. It stressed the importance, in a post-colonial age, of accommodation to local cultures. The basic question was: How to be Catholic without being Western? Some African bishops wanted more autonomy from Roman supervision. The schema was very well received and the discussion lasted only 3 days.

Christian education

For two days (October 13–14), the Council Fathers discussed the schema on Christian Education. It said little that was new. Like many other documents issued by Church authorities, it insisted on the importance of Catholic schools. The situation of Catholic schools varied from country to country – some were state-supported, others were not – and so it was difficult to say anything that applied to all of them. Many bishops wanted the schema rewritten, but they were told there was no time for a new text. So after two days of discussion, the schema was accepted without much enthusiasm.  Close to 10% of the Council Fathers voted against it, to show their displeasure with its lack of aggiornamento. It is one of the two Vatican II documents considered something of a failure (along with the decree on the Modern Means of Communication). “Even at the last minute, dissatisfaction with the text was widespread and wide-ranging”

Non-Christian religions

The opposition to this schema that was originally about “the Jews” came from theological conservatives as well as the Arab bishops who feared repercussions from their governments. The Secretariat for Christian Unity decided to win over the Arab bishops, and succeeded in doing so by agreeing to a few textual changes during the interval between the 3rd and 4th sessions. There was also a diplomatic offensive to convince the predominantly Muslim governments in the Middle East that the schema was not just about “the Jews” since there was also a section that had positive things to say about Islam.

The various votes on the revised schema took place on October 14 and 15. The final vote was 1,763 in favour, 250 opposed, a much better result than could have been imagined a year earlier.

The ministry and life of priests

The last of the schemas, it came before the Council Fathers on October 14.

Two concepts of the role of priests could be discerned in the debate. The more traditional one was about the priest as sacramental minister with special powers, especially those of consecrating the bread and wine at mass and absolving penitents of their sins. This conception also stressed authority: the priest exercised authority over laypeople, just as the bishop exercised a similar authority over priests. The newer conception, the one advocated in the schema, saw the priest as someone who serves the Church and society through his leadership; in this view, the relation between priests and those they served is closer to one of friendship (“the good shepherd”) and the same is true of the relationship of bishop and priest.

In the first conception, the word “priest” expresses the cultic function performed by the ordained minister. In the second conception, the preferred term is “presbyter”, the term used in the early Church, because it implies more than the sacramental role suggested by “priest”. The presbyter shares in the threefold ministry of Christ: he is prophet (preacher of the Word of God), priest (minister of the sacraments) and king (leader of the community). Instead of the traditional conception that his main function was celebrating mass and hearing confession, the schema stated that his primary duty was proclaiming the Gospel to all.

The one important issue the schema did not address was that of compulsory celibacy for priests of the Latin Church. On October 11, two days before the schema was to be discussed, Pope Paul preempted the debate by announcing he was withdrawing the issue of celibacy from the conciliar agenda. Bishops who wished to address the issue could send their comments in writing to him. It was expected the Pope would hand the issue to a special committee. But no committee was ever set up, and in 1967 Pope Paul issued Sacerdotalis caelibatus, the encyclical maintaining clerical celibacy for Latin priests.

The schema was approved in principle on October 16, and after further voting on amendments, it received final approval on November 12.

A change of pace 

By Saturday October 16, the end of the session's fifth week, 5 schemas had received final approval, and the remaining ones had all been accepted in principle. Things were moving along faster than expected. And the Fathers were suffering from Council fatigue. So the sixth week of the session (17-24 October) was declared a holiday from conciliar work, and everyone was able to relax. When the Fathers returned on October 25, debates were over: since all remaining schemas had been accepted in principle, the only work left for the General Congregations was to vote on the amendments as the schemas were returned by the respective Commissions.

There was a Public Session on October 28, when the 5 schemas approved so far became documents of Vatican II: the decrees on the renewal of religious life Perfectae caritatis, on Christian Education Gravissimum educationis, on the pastoral office of bishops Christus Dominus, on Priestly Training Optatam totius, and the declaration on Non-Christian Religions Nostra aetate.

There were no General Congregations during the following week (31 Oct – 7 Nov), because the Commissions were falling behind in their work of sifting through all the proposed amendments and revising the schemas before sending them back to the Council Fathers. So the eighth week of the Fourth Session was devoted exclusively to Commission work, as their members worked feverishly to clear the backlog of amendments.

Voting on the last schemas 

After the Council Fathers' second one-week break, there were 3 weeks of practically non-stop voting on the 6 remaining schemas: for each one, there were multiple votes on amendments, then on chapters and finally on the whole schema. In the course of those weeks, the six remaining schemas received their final approval.

Last-minute moves were sometimes successful in winning over opponents, sometimes not. On religious freedom, the Pope urged the Secretariat for Christian unity to take into account the wishes of the schema's opponents in the hope the final vote might be almost unanimous. The Secretariat made some changes, but the opponents were not swayed and 11% of the Fathers voted against the schema. On the matter of Tradition in the schema on Revelation, the conservatives realized they could do no better than the compromise formula “The Church does not draw her certainty for all revealed truths from Scripture alone”: as a result, many of them chose to accept the schema and there were only 27 negative votes on the day of final approval. For the schema on the Lay Apostolate, the Pope sent 12 amendments to the Commission responsible for the schema. They were basically matters of wording: the Commission accepted some, and dropped others, and the schema was adopted with only 2 negative votes.

As for the schema on the Church in the Modern World, it still avoided saying anything about contraception (because a papal commission was studying the matter). Some conservatives began lobbying the Pope to step in. On November 24, Cardinal Ottaviani received a letter from Paul VI insisting that the schema had to condemn the use of contraception; leaving the matter open as the schema did would suggest the Church was ready to change its position. The Doctrinal Commission decided to include in the schema references to previous papal rejections of contraception, but not to issue any condemnation of its own. The Pope was satisfied with this solution. Nevertheless, when time came for final approval, the opposition stayed firm: 11% of the Council Fathers still rejected the schema.

In the midst of all this voting, there was another public session on November 18, and two of the remaining schemas became the Dogmatic Constitution on Divine Revelation Dei verbum and the decree on the Apostolate of the Laity Apostolicam actuositatem.

Indulgences 

One of the issues some bishops wanted discussed at the council was that of indulgences, but the topic never made it onto the conciliar agenda. A month after his being elected pope in the summer of 1963, Paul VI set up a commission to study the issue. The commission produced a report suggesting a mild modernization of the practice of indulgences, but no important changes.
 
Once it became clear that the workload of the fourth period would be less than originally expected, the Pope decided to use some of the available time to ask the national groups of bishops for their reaction to the report. November 10 and succeeding days were set aside for responses. Eleven national groups delivered oral responses in the council hall, and 12 others written responses. The Italian and Spanish bishops were favourable to the report, while most others were highly critical: they cast doubt on the theological foundation of indulgences, and suggested a complete reform of the system, some even urging outright abolition. Patriarch Maximos IV insisted there was no evidence of indulgences during the first millennium. The presentations were cut short after 2 days. Two years later, Pope Paul would decree a modest reform of the system of indulgences, while insisting on their importance.

The Council's Final Days 

On December 4, Pope Paul took part in an ecumenical prayer service with the hundred or so non-Catholic observers present at the council in the Basilica of Saint Paul outside the Walls. It was the first time a Pope had prayed publicly with non-Catholic Christians, something unthinkable just a few years earlier.

On December 6, there were speeches at St. Peter's thanking everyone who had taken part in the council. Each Council Father received a gold ring to commemorate the historic event. The Pope declared a jubilee from 8 December to Pentecost 1966 (later extended to 8 December 1966) to urge all Catholics to study and accept the decisions of the council and apply them in spiritual renewal. He also issued a motu proprio reforming the Holy Office. The reform was fairly minor: the office's name was changed to Congregation for the Doctrine of the Faith, and procedures were set in place ensuring that theologians accused of deviating from Church teachings would have a hearing before any action was taken against them (a procedural safeguard that did not exist up to that point).

December 7 was the day for the promulgation of the 4 remaining schemas: they became the Constitution on the Church in the Modern World Gaudium et spes, the decree on the Ministry and Life of Priests Presbyterorum ordinis, the decree on the Missionary Activity of the Church Ad gentes, and the declaration on religious freedom Dignitatis humanae.

Before the promulgation, the Council Fathers witnessed a moving moment in the history of Christianity. A Joint Declaration by Pope Paul and Patriarch Athenagoras of Constantinople was read out, deploring the mutual excommunications of 1054 which resulted in the Great Schism between the Catholic and Eastern Orthodox Churches, recognizing the responsibility of both parties for the separation and promising to work for complete communion between the two Churches. This was followed by the reading of the Pope's Apostolic Letter lifting the Catholic Church's excommunication of the Orthodox in 1054. At the same time, in the Patriarchal cathedral in Istanbul, the Joint Declaration was read out in Greek and the Orthodox excommunication of the Catholics was lifted.

December 8: the final day of the council had arrived. A huge crowd, estimated at 300,000 people, gathered in St. Peter's Square for an outdoor mass closing the council. The mass was broadcast worldwide by radio and television. The Pope's homily was addressed to all humanity because for the Church “no one is a stranger, no one is excluded, no one is distant”.

Mass was followed by a series of messages (in French) addressed to various categories of people, including heads of government, women, workers, young people, and the poor and sick. The Secretary General of the council then read the Apostolic Letter declaring the council concluded, and instructing that “everything the Council decreed be religiously and devoutly observed by all the faithful”. The Pope gave his blessing to all present and dismissed them: “In the name of our Lord Jesus Christ, go in peace”. To which all responded with enthusiasm (and probably relief): “Thanks be to God!”

Documents of the council 
Vatican II's teaching is contained in sixteen documents: 4 constitutions, 9 decrees and 3 declarations. While the constitutions are clearly the documents of highest importance, "the distinction between decrees and declarations, no matter what it originally meant, has become meaningless".

For each document, approval of the final text was followed a few days later by the pope's promulgation of the document as the Church's official teaching. On the day of promulgation, there was a second vote of approval by the Council Fathers: it was "basically ceremonial" since the document's final text had already been approved a few days earlier. It is this earlier vote that best indicates the degree of support for, or opposition to, the document. Most documents were approved by overwhelming margins. In only 6 cases were the negative votes in the triple digits. In 3 of these cases (Church and Modern World, Non-Christian Religions and Religious Freedom), 10% to 12% of the Fathers rejected the document on theological grounds. In 2 other cases (Media and Christian Education), the negative votes mostly expressed disappointment in a bland text, rather than opposition.

Constitution on the Sacred Liturgy 

Sacrosanctum Concilium, the Constitution on the Sacred Liturgy, was the blueprint for an extensive reform of the Western liturgy.

Chapter 1 of the Constitution set out principles to guide this reform:
 The Paschal mystery of Christ's death and resurrection is made present to us through the liturgy, which is a communal celebration and not just the action of the priest. Each person present participates in it according to his/her role.
 Christ is present to us not only under the appearance of bread and wine, but also in the Word of God, in the person of the priest and in the gathered assembly
 “The liturgy is the summit toward which the activity of the Church is directed; at the same time it is the font from which all her power flows” (SC 10)
 “In the restoration and promotion of the sacred liturgy, [...] full and active participation by all the people is the aim to be considered before all else.” (SC 14)
 In order to be better understood, the rites should be simplified and a limited use of the vernacular is permitted (but the use of Latin is to be preserved).
 There needs to be more reading from holy scripture, and it is to be more varied and suitable.
 A certain degree of local adaptation is permissible.

Chapter 2 (The Mass): the Eucharist is both the sacrifice of Christ's body and blood and a paschal banquet. In addition to repeating the need for simplification of the rites and active participation, the chapter decrees that certain practices that had disappeared (such as the prayer of the faithful, concelebration, and communion under both kinds for the laity) are to be restored under certain conditions, and that the homily should be a commentary on the Scripture readings. 

Chapter 3 (Sacraments): the rite of each sacrament is to be simplified in order to make its meaning clear; the catechumenate is to be restored for adult baptism; the link between confirmation and baptism is to be made clear; the sacrament then called extreme unction is to become a sacrament for those who are seriously ill (anointing of the sick) and not just of those who are on the point of death; funerals are to focus on the hope of the resurrection and not on mourning, and local cultural practices may be included in the celebration of some sacraments such as weddings.

Chapters 4 to 7 provide that the divine office (now called Liturgy of the Hours) is to be adapted to modern conditions by reducing its length for those in active ministry, that the calendar is to be revised to give Sunday and the mysteries of Christ priority over saints' days, and that, while traditional music forms such as Gregorian chant and organ music are to be preserved, congregational singing is to be encouraged and the use of other instruments is permissible. 

The Constitution on the Sacred Liturgy launched the most extensive revision of the liturgy in the history of the Church.

The invitation for more active, conscious participation of the laity through Mass in the vernacular did not stop with the constitution on the liturgy. It was taken up by the later documents of the council that called for a more active participation of the laity in the life of the Church. Pope Francis referred to a turn away from clericalism toward a new age of the laity.

Dogmatic Constitution on the Church 

The Dogmatic Constitution on the Church Lumen gentium ("Light of the Nations") gave direction to several of the documents that followed it, including those on Ecumenism, on Non-Christian Religions, on Religious Freedom, and on The Church in the Modern World (see below). According to Paul VI, "the most characteristic and ultimate purpose of the teachings of the Council" is the universal call to holiness. John Paul II calls this "an intrinsic and essential aspect of [the council Fathers'] teaching on the Church", where "all the faithful of Christ of whatever rank or status, are called to the fullness of the Christian life and to the perfection of charity" (Lumen gentium, 40). Francis, in his apostolic letter Evangelii Gaudium (17) which laid out the programmatic for his pontificate, said that "on the basis of the teaching of the Dogmatic Constitution Lumen Gentium" he would discuss the entire People of God which evangelizes, missionary outreach, the inclusion of the poor in society, and peace and dialogue within society. Francis has also followed the call of the council for a more collegial style of leadership, through synods of bishops and through his personal use of a worldwide advisory council of eight cardinals. A most contentious conclusion that seems to follow from the Bishops' teaching in the decree is that while "in some sense other Christian communities are institutionally defective," these communities can "in some cases be more effective as vehicles of grace." Belgian Bishop Emil de Smedt, commenting on institutional defects that had crept into the Catholic church, "contrasted the hierarchical model of the church that embodied the triad of 'clericalism, legalism, and triumphalism' with one that emphasized the 'people of God', filled with the gifts of the Holy Spirit and radically equal in grace," that was extolled in Lumen Gentium.

Dogmatic Constitution on Divine Revelation 
The council's document Dei Verbum ("The Word of God") states the principle active in the other council documents that "The study of the sacred page is, as it were, the soul of sacred theology". It is said of Dei Verbum that "arguably it is the most seminal of all the conciliar documents," with the fruits of a return to the Bible as the foundation of Christian life and teaching, evident in the other council documents. Joseph Ratzinger, who would become Benedict XVI, said of the emphasis on the Bible in the council that prior to Vatican II the theology manuals continued to confuse "propositions about revelation with the content of revelation. It represented not abiding truths of faith, but rather the peculiar characteristics of post-Reformation polemic." In spite of the guarded approval of biblical scholarship under Pius XII, scholars suspected of Modernism were silenced right up to Vatican II. The council brought a definitive end to the Counter-Reformation and, in a spirit of aggiornamento, reached back "behind St. Thomas himself and the Fathers, to the biblical theology which governs the first two chapters of the Constitution on the Church." "The documents of the Second Vatican Council are shot through with the language of the Bible. ...The church's historical journey away from its earlier focus upon these sources was reversed at Vatican II." For instance, the council's document on the liturgy called for a broader use of liturgical texts, which would now be in the vernacular, along with more enlightened preaching on the Bible explaining "the love affair between God and humankind". The translation of liturgical texts into vernacular languages, the allowance of communion under both kinds for the laity, and the expansion of Scripture readings during the Mass was resonant with the sensibilities of other Christian denominations, thus making the Second Vatican Council "a milestone for Catholic, Protestants, [and] the Orthodox".

Pastoral Constitution on the Church in the Modern World

This document, named for its first words Gaudium et Spes ("Joy and Hope"), built on Lumen Gentiums understanding of the Church as the “pilgrim people of God” and as “communion”, aware of the long history of the Church's teaching and in touch with what it calls the “signs of the times”. It reflects the understanding that Baptism confers on all the task that Jesus entrusted to the Church, to be on mission to the world in ways that the present age can understand, in cooperation with the ongoing work of the Spirit.

Decrees and declarations on the Church as People of God

These seven documents apply the teaching contained in the Constitution on the Church Lumen gentium to the various categories of people in the Church – bishops, priests, religious, laity, Eastern Catholics – and to Christian education.The Pastoral Office of Bishops – The decree Christus Dominus ("Christ the Lord", 1965) deals with practical matters concerning bishops and dioceses, on the basis of the theology of the episcopate found in chapter 3 of Lumen gentium, including collegiality. It deals with the 3 levels where a bishop exercises his ministry: the universal Church, his own diocese and the national or regional level. 

The universal Church (CD 4-10). Since the doctrine of collegiality holds that bishops share with the pope the governance of the universal Church, the decree proposes that there be a council of bishops from around the world to assist the pope in this governance. (It would later be called the Synod of bishops.) And since the true purpose of the Roman Curia is to serve the bishops, it needs to be reorganized and become more international.

The diocese (CD 11-35). The decree gives a job description of the bishop in his ministry as teacher, sanctifier and shepherd. It discusses his relationship to the main office-holders in the diocese, and deals with such practical matters as the need to redraw diocesan boundaries as a result of shifts in population. 

The national or regional level (CD 36-44). The decree stresses the need for an intermediate level between the universal Church and the individual diocese: this is the national (or regional) episcopal conference, an institution that did not exist in all countries at the time.  The Ministry and Life of Priests – The decree Presbyterorum ordinis ("The order of priests", 1965) describes priests as "father and teacher" but also "brothers among brothers with all those who have been reborn at the baptismal font." Priests must "promote the dignity" of the laity, "willingly listen" to them, acknowledge and diligently foster "exalted charisms of the laity", and "entrust to the laity duties in the service of the Church, allowing them freedom and room for action." Also, the human and spiritual needs of priests are discussed in detail.Priestly Training – The decree Optatam totius ("Desired [renewal] of the whole [Church]", 1965) seeks to adapt the training of priests to modern conditions. While some of the points made in the decree are quite traditional, such as the insistence that seminaries remain the main place for priestly training, there are interesting proposals for adaptation to new conditions. The first is that instead of having the program of formation set for the whole Catholic world by the Congregation for Seminaries and Universities in Rome, the bishops of each country may devise a program that is adapted to the needs of their particular country (though it still needs Rome's approval). Another is that training for the priesthood has to integrate 3 dimensions: spiritual, intellectual and pastoral. 

Spiritual formation aims to produce a mature minister, and to this end may call on the resources of psychology. There are many proposals for improving intellectual formation: the use of modern teaching methods; a better integration of philosophy and theology; the centrality of Scripture in theological studies; knowledge of other religions. Pastoral formation should be present throughout the course of studies and should include practical experience of ministry. Finally, there should be ongoing formation after ordination.The Adaptation and Renewal of Religious Life – The decree Perfectae Caritatis ("Of perfect charity", 1965) deals with the adaptation of religious life to modern conditions. The decree presupposes the theology of the religious life found in chapter 6 of the Constitution on the Church (Lumen Gentium), to which it adds guidelines for renewal. The two basic principles that should guide this renewal are: “the constant return [...] to the original spirit of the institutes and their adaptation to the changed conditions of our time” (PC 2). The decree deals mainly with religious orders, also known as religious institutes (whose members take vows and live a communal life), but touches also societies of common life (whose members take no vows but live a communal life) and secular institutes (whose members take vows but do not share a communal life).

The decree restates well-known views on the religious life, such as the consecrated life as a life of following Christ, the importance of the three vows of poverty, chastity and obedience, and the importance of charity in the life of an order. To these it adds a call for every order, whether contemplative or active, to renew itself, as well as specific proposals for adaptation to new conditions, such as the simplification of the religious habit, the importance of education for members of all religious orders (and not just priests), and the need for poverty not just for individual members but for each order as a whole.The Apostolate of the Laity – The decree Apostolicam actuositatem ("Apostolic Activity", 1965) declares that the apostolate of the laity is "not only to bring the message and grace of Christ to men but also to penetrate and perfect the temporal order with the spirit of the Gospel", in every field of life, together or through various groups, with respectful cooperation with the Church's hierarchy.The Eastern Catholic Churches – The decree Orientalium Ecclesiarum ("Of the Eastern Churches", 1964) deals with the Eastern Catholic Churches, those communities that are in full union with Rome, but have their own distinctive liturgy, customs (such as married priests) and forms of organization (patriarchs and synods). The decree states that they are not simply different rites (as they were commonly called previously) but are sui iuris particular Churches along with the much larger Latin Church, and with the same rights as the Latin Church, including the right to govern themselves according to their traditional organizational practices. The decree affirms certain practices typical of the Eastern Churches, such as the administration of confirmation by priests, as well as the possibility of satisfying Sunday obligation by taking part in the Canonical Hours. It also provides guidelines concerning common worship and shared communion between Eastern Catholics and members of the Eastern Orthodox Church.  Christian Education – The declaration Gravissimum educationis ("Extreme [importance] of education", 1965) discusses the importance of education (GE 1), of Christian education (GE 2-7), of Catholic schools (GE 8-9) and of Catholic colleges and universities (GE 10-12). Most everything in the declaration had been said many times before: the Church has the right to establish Catholic schools; parents have the right to choose the education they want for their children, governments have a duty to fund Catholic schools; and Catholics have a duty to support Catholic schools. 

Many observers found the declaration disappointing: “Even at the last minute, dissatisfaction with the text was widespread and wide-ranging”. It was called "probably the most inferior document produced by the Council". But as it was late in the 4th session when everyone was under pressure to bring the council's business to a close, most bishops chose to vote for the text, though close to 9% rejected it.

Decrees and declarations on the Church in the world

These 5 documents deal with the Church in its relationship with the surrounding world: other religious groups – non-Catholic Christians, non-Christians – missionary outreach, religious freedom, and the media. Three of them – on ecumenism, non-Christian religions and religious freedom – were important advances in the Church's teaching.Mission Activity – The decree Ad gentes ("To the Nations", 1965) treats evangelization as the fundamental mission of the Catholic Church, "to bring good news to the poor." It includes sections on training missionaries and on forming communities.Ecumenism – The decree Unitatis redintegratio ("Restoration of Unity", 1964) opens with the statement: "The restoration of unity among all Christians is one of the principal concerns of the Second Vatican Council." This was a reversal of the Church's previous position, one of hostility or, at best, indifference to the ecumenical movement, because the Church claimed the only way unity would come about was if the non-Catholics returned to the true Church. The text produced by the Secretariat for Christian Unity said many things Catholics had not heard before:

Instead of showing hostility or indifference to the ecumenical movement, a movement which originated among Anglicans and Protestants, the decree states it was fostered by the Holy Spirit. Instead of repeating the previous prohibition on Catholics taking part in ecumenical activities, the decree states that a concern for unity is an obligation for all Catholics.

Instead of claiming that disunity is the fault of non-Catholic Christians, the decree states that the Catholic Church must accept its share of the blame and ask for forgiveness. Instead of claiming that the Catholic Church is in no need of reform, the decree states that all Christians, including Catholics, must examine their own faithfulness to Christ's will, and undertake whatever internal reforms are called for. Ecumenism requires a new attitude, a "change of heart" (UR 7), an interior conversion, on the part of Catholics.

Instead of claiming that only the Catholic Church has the means of salvation, the decree states that non-Catholic Christians have many of the elements of the true Church and, thanks to these, they can achieve salvation. All baptized are members of Christ's body. Catholics must get rid of false images of non-Catholics and come to appreciate the riches of their traditions.

Theological experts from both sides should enter into dialogue, in which each side sets out clearly its understanding of the Gospel. It should be remembered there is a hierarchy of truths, that not all teachings are equally central to the faith. Christians of various traditions should pray together, though intercommunion is still not possible, and undertake actions for the common good of humanity.

The last chapter addresses the situation of the Eastern Orthodox and of Protestants. The Orthodox are very close to the Catholic Church: they have valid sacraments and a valid priesthood, and though their customs and liturgical practices are different, this is not an obstacle to unity. Protestants comprise many denominations and their closeness to the Catholic Church varies according to the denomination. But all of them share with Catholics the belief in Jesus as saviour, the Bible, baptism, worship and the effort to lead a moral life.     

This new way of considering the issue of Church unity met with great approval at the council and was adopted with very few dissenting voices.Relation of the Church to Non-Christian Religions – The declaration Nostra aetate ("In our time", 1965), the shortest of Vatican II's documents, is a brief commentary on non-Christian religions, with a special section on the Jews. Pope John wanted the council to condemn antisemitism, including any Catholic teaching that might encourage antisemitism. It was felt the way to avoid stirring up trouble in the Middle East was to include the passage on the Jews within a broader document about non-Christian religions.

Avoiding argument or criticism, the declaration points out some positive features of Hinduism, Buddhism and Islam. “The Catholic Church rejects nothing of what is holy and true in these religions”; they often “reflect a ray of that truth which enlightens all men and women” (NA 2).

As for the Jews, the declaration says they are very dear to God: “God does not take back the gifts he bestowed or the choice he made” (NA 4). Jews are not rejected or cursed by God because of the death of Jesus: neither all Jews then, nor any Jew today, can be blamed for the death of Jesus. The Church deplores all hatred and antisemitism. And the declaration ends with a condemnation of all forms of discrimination based on religion or ethnicity.
In [the Declaration], a Council for the first time in history acknowledges the search for the absolute by other men and by whole races and peoples, and honours the truth and holiness in other religions as the work of the one living God. [...] Furthermore, in it the Church gives glory to God for his enduring faithfulness towards his chosen people, the Jews.
Better Jewish-Catholic relations have been emphasized since the council.Religious Freedom – The declaration Dignitatis humanae ("Of the Dignity of the Human Person", 1965), "on the right of the person and of communities to social and civil freedom in matters religious", is the most striking instance of the council's staking out a new position.

Traditional Catholic teaching rejected freedom of religion as a basic human right. The argument: only Catholics have the truth and so they alone are entitled to freedom of belief and of practice. All other religions are in error and, since “error has no rights”, other religions have no right to freedom of belief and practice, and Catholic states have the right to suppress them. While it may be prudent to tolerate the existence of other religions in order to avoid civil unrest, this is merely a favour extended to them, not a matter of right. This double standard became increasingly intolerable to many Catholics. Furthermore, Protestants would not believe in the sincerity of Catholics' involvement in ecumenism, if they continued to support this double standard. Pope John's last encyclical, Pacem in terris (April 1963), listed freedom of religion among the basic human rights – the first papal document to support freedom of religion – and he wanted Vatican II to address the issue.

Dignitatis humanae broke with the traditional position and asserted that every human being was entitled to religious freedom. The argument: belief cannot be coerced. Since the Church wants people's religious belief to be genuine, people must be left free to see the truth of what is preached. The declaration also appealed to revelation: Jesus did not coerce people to accept his teaching, but invited them to believe, and so did his immediate followers.

Most Council Fathers supported this position, but 11% of them rejected it on the day of the final vote. If this position was true, they said, then the Church's previous teaching was wrong, and this was a conclusion they could not accept. The council's position on religious freedom raised in an acute way the issue of the development of doctrine: how can later teachings develop out of earlier ones? And how to tell whether a new position is a legitimate development of previous teaching or is heresy? The Means of Social Communication – The decree Inter mirifica ("Among the wonderful [discoveries]", 1963) addresses issues concerning the press, cinema, television, and other media of communication. Chapter 1 is concerned with the dangers presented by the media, and insists that media producers should ensure that the media offer moral content, that media consumers should avoid media whose content is not moral, and that parents should supervise their children's media consumption. Chapter 2 discusses the usefulness of the media for the Church's mission: Catholic press and cinema should be promoted, and suitable persons within the Church should be trained in the use of the media.

“The text [is] generally considered to be one of the weakest of the Council.” Rather than improve it, most Council Fathers preferred approving it as is and moving on to more important matters. Some 25% of the Council Fathers voted against it to express their disappointment.

 Traditionalist groups rejecting the council 

Various traditionalist Catholic groups rejecting the validity of the council arose starting from the 1970s. The largest one is the Society of Saint Pius X (SSPX), which recognises the authority of the Pope but rejects the validity of the Second Vatican Council. The SSPX was excommunicated in 1988 by Pope John Paul II, but the excommunication was lifted in 2009 by Pope Benedict XVI; despite this, they are not in full communion with the Holy See and their sacraments are considered to be licit only with approvation of the Holy See.

Other, more radical groups have gone further than the SSPX and have declared that the Holy See has been vacant since the death of Pope Pius XII (sedevacantism) or that all the Pontiffs since Pope John XXIII are popes materially but not formally (sedeprivationism). The most notable of these groups are the Society of Saint Pius V, the Congregation of Mary Immaculate Queen and the Institute Mater Boni Consilii.

 Authority of the council 
The 1917 Code of Canon Law, in force in the Latin Church at the time of the council, stated: "An Ecumenical Council enjoys supreme power over the universal Church."

The issue of the authority of Vatican II was addressed by Pope Paul VI five weeks after the end of the council in the talk he gave at his general audience of 12 January 1966:

There are those who ask what is the authority, the theological qualification, that the Council wished to attribute to its teachings, knowing that it avoided giving solemn dogmatic definitions engaging the infallibility of the ecclesiastical magisterium. And the answer is known to those who recall the conciliar declaration of March 6, 1964, repeated on November 16, 1964: given the pastoral character of the Council, it avoided proclaiming in an extraordinary way dogmas endowed with the note of infallibility; but it nevertheless endowed its teachings with the authority of the supreme ordinary magisterium, and this ordinary -- and obviously authentic -- magisterium must be accepted docilely and sincerely by all the faithful, according to the mind of the Council regarding the nature and purposes of the individual documents.

The 1983 Code of Canon Law states that Catholics may not disregard the teaching of an ecumenical council even if it does not propose its teaching as definitive: 
Although not an assent of faith, a religious submission of the intellect and will must be given to a Doctrine which the Supreme Pontiff or the College of Bishops declares concerning faith or morals when they exercise the authentic Magisterium, even if they do not intend to proclaim it by definitive act; therefore, the Christian faithful are to take care to avoid those things which do not agree with it.

 Spirit of Vatican II 
By "the spirit of Vatican II" is often meant promoting teachings and intentions attributed to the Second Vatican Council in ways not limited to literal readings of its documents, spoken of as the "letter" of the councilAvery Dulles, Vatican II: The Myth and the Reality (cf. Saint Paul's phrase, "the letter kills, but the Spirit gives life").

The spirit of Vatican II is invoked for a great variety of ideas and attitudes. Bishop John Tong Hon of Hong Kong used it with regard merely to an openness to dialogue with others, saying: "We are guided by the spirit of Vatican II: only dialogue and negotiation can solve conflicts."

In contrast, Michael Novak described it as a spirit that
sometimes soared far beyond the actual, hard-won documents and decisions of Vatican II. ...It was as though the world (or at least the history of the Church) were now to be divided into only two periods, pre-Vatican II and post-Vatican II. Everything "pre" was then pretty much dismissed, so far as its authority mattered. For the most extreme, to be a Catholic now meant to believe more or less anything one wished to believe, or at least in the sense in which one personally interpreted it. One could be a Catholic "in spirit". One could take Catholic to mean the 'culture' in which one was born, rather than to mean a creed making objective and rigorous demands. One could imagine Rome as a distant and irrelevant anachronism, embarrassment, even adversary. Rome as "them". 
From another perspective, Church historian John W. O'Malley writes:  
For the new churches it recommended adaptation to local cultures, including philosophical and theological adaptation. It also recommended that Catholic missionaries seek ways of cooperating with missionaries of other faiths and of fostering harmonious relations with them. It asserted that art from every race and country be given scope in the liturgy of the church. More generally, it made clear that the church was sympathetic to the way of life of different peoples and races and was ready to appropriate aspects of different cultural traditions. Though obvious-sounding, these provisions were portentous. Where would they lead?

 Legacy 

 Some changes resulting from Vatican II 
The council addressed relations between the Catholic Church and the modern world.    Several changes resulting from the council include the renewal of consecrated life with a revised charism, ecumenical efforts with other Christian denominations, interfaith dialogue with other religions, and the universal call to holiness, which according to Paul VI was "the most characteristic and ultimate purpose of the teachings of the Council".

According to Pope Benedict XVI, the most important and essential message of the council was "the Paschal Mystery as the center of what it is to be Christian and therefore of the Christian life, the Christian year, the Christian seasons". With many of these changes resonating with the perspectives of other Christian denominations who sent observers to the Second Vatican Council, it was an ecumenical "milestone for Catholics, Protestants, [and] the Orthodox". These changes, while praised by many faithful Catholics, remain divisive among those identifying as traditionalist Catholics.

Dignitatis humanae, authored largely by United States theologian John Courtney Murray, challenged the council fathers to find "reasons for religious freedom" in which they believed, and drew from scripture scholar John L. McKenzie the comment: "The Church can survive the disorder of development better than she can stand the living death of organized immobility."	

As a result of the reforms of Vatican II, on 15 August 1972 Paul issued the motu proprio Ministeria Quaedam which in effect suppressed the minor orders and replaced them with two instituted ministries, those of lector and acolyte. A major difference was: "Ministries may be assigned to lay Christians; hence they are no longer to be considered as reserved to candidates for the sacrament of orders."

 Fiftieth Anniversary 
To mark the fiftieth anniversary of the beginning of Vatican II, in October 2011, Benedict XVI declared the period from October 2012 to the Solemnity of Christ the King at the end of November 2013 a "Year of Faith", as:

 Vatican II and the pontificate of Pope Francis 

It has been suggested that the pontificate of Francis will be looked upon as the "decisive moment in the history of the church in which the full force of the Second Vatican Council's reformist vision was finally realized." Francis returned to the Vatican II theme of ressourcement, breaking with the Catholic philosophical tradition that had originated with Thomas Aquinas seven centuries before,''' and looked to original sources in the New Testament. In contrast to John Paul II who emphasized continuity with the past in Vatican II's teachings, Francis' words and actions were noted from the start for their discontinuities, with an emphasis on Jesus himself and on mercy: a "church that is poor and for the poor", "disposal of the baroque trappings" in liturgical celebrations, and revision of the institutional aspects of the church. From his first gesture when elected Pope, calling himself simply Bishop of Rome, Francis connected with the thrust of the council away from "legalism, triumphalism, and clericalism". He made greater use of church synods, and instituted a more collegial manner of governance by constituting a Council of Cardinal Advisers from throughout the world to assist him which a church historian calls the "most important step in the history of the church for the past 10 centuries." His refocusing the Church on “a moral theology that rests on scripture and Jesus’ command to love” is also seen as coming from the council, as is his lifting up the laity for mission and calling for the presence of women in theologates. He has softened the "forbidding" image of the Church by applying Vatican II's views on respect for conscience to issues like atheism, homosexuality, and the sacraments. This has led to a struggle between "anti-Vatican II diehards and clerics who prefer John XXIII’s (and Francis’s) generosity of spirit." On the issue of liturgy, he has tried to advance the renewal initiated by Vatican II that would elicit more conscious, active participation by the people. And while his predecessors had taken a dim view of liberation theology, his more positive view is seen as flowing from a discernment of "the signs of the times" called for by Gaudium et spes.

 Vatican II participants who later became pope 
Of those who took part in the council's opening session, four have become popes: Cardinal Giovanni Battista Montini, who on succeeding John XXIII took the name Paul VI; Bishop Albino Luciani, the future John Paul I; Bishop Karol Wojtyła, who became John Paul II; and Father Joseph Ratzinger, present as a theological consultant, who became Benedict XVI.

Saints of Vatican II
Several of the fathers and theologians-experts, as well as several Roman Popes and council observers, became canonized saints or are in the process of canonization. These include:

John XXIII, pontiff who called for the council and presided over it first (thus his feast day is the same date as the opening date of Vatican II)
Paul VI, second pope of the council
John Paul II, council father as Bishop Karol Józef Wojtyła
Álvaro del Portillo, council father
Fulton J. Sheen, council father
John Paul I, council father as Albino Luciani
Terence Cooke
Frank Duff
Cyril Bernard Papali

 Notes 

 References 
 Citations 

 Sources 

  31 folios. (Official record of daily proceedings during Vatican II, in Latin) Available online at https://archive.org/details/second-vatican-council
 
 
 
 
 
 
 
 
 
 
 
 
 
 
  Formerly titled The Rhine Flows into the Tiber: a History of Vatican II'' (1967)

Further reading 
  16 folios. (Official record of the Antepreparatory Period, in Latin) Available online at https://archive.org/details/second-vatican-council 
  8 folios. (Official record of the Preparatory Period, in Latin) Available online at https://archive.org/details/second-vatican-council 
 
 
 
 
 .
 .
 .
 .
 .
 
 .
 . Vatican II in the light of Tradition and Magisterium of the Catholic Church.
 .
 .
 .
 
 .
 
 .
 .
 
 
 .
 .
 
 
 .

External links 

 Documents of the Second Vatican Council at Vatican.va

 
1960s in Christianity
1960s in Italy
1960s in Vatican City
1962 establishments in Italy
1965 disestablishments in Italy
Vatican II
Vatican II
Vatican II
Vatican II
Organisations based in Rome
Pope John XXIII
Pope Paul VI
Religious organisations based in Italy
Religious organizations disestablished in 1965
Christian organizations established in 1962